Batcheller may refer to:

Tryphosa Bates-Batcheller, American socialite
George Sherman Batcheller, American soldier, politician, diplomat and jurist

See also
Bachelor
David Batcheller Mellish, United States Representative from New York
James Batcheller Sumner, American chemist
Doris Batcheller Humphrey, American dancer